Giovanni Camputaro (born 6 April 1955) is an Italian boxer. He competed in the men's flyweight event at the 1976 Summer Olympics.

References

External links
 

1955 births
Living people
Italian male boxers
Olympic boxers of Italy
Boxers at the 1976 Summer Olympics
Sportspeople from the Province of Caserta
Flyweight boxers
20th-century Italian people